PH McIntyre (born 18 August 1986) is a South African professional golfer.

McIntyre has played on the Sunshine Tour since turning professional in 2008. He has won twice, including the 2015 Investec Royal Swazi Open.

Professional wins (3)

Sunshine Tour wins (2)

Sunshine Tour playoff record (1–0)

IGT Pro Tour wins (1)

References

External links

South African male golfers
Sunshine Tour golfers
People from Lesedi Local Municipality
Sportspeople from Gauteng
White South African people
1986 births
Living people